Raymond Tam Chi-yuen is a Hong Kong politician.

He was one of the undersecretaries appointed by the Government of Hong Kong in 2008. He has an educational background in engineering, and has worked in various capacities in the civil service since 1987. He was appointed as the Secretary for Constitutional and Mainland Affairs in 2011.

Education
Tam has a Bachelor of Science degree in engineering from the University of Hong Kong.

Career
He joined the Administrative Service in September 1987, and rose to the rank of Administrative Officer Staff Grade B in April 2007.  Tam has served in various bureaus and departments including the Central Policy Unit, the former Constitutional Affairs Bureau, the Office of the Financial Secretary, the Chief Executive's Office, the Hong Kong Economic and Trade Office in Geneva, Information Services Department and the Home Affairs Bureau. His meteoric rise from undersecretary (D3 rank) to the director of the Chief Executive's Office (above D8 rank) in less than two years was a rarity and radical departure from normal civil service promotion. In 2006, Tien resigned as chairman of the KCRC due to disputes with other directors over his management style.

In December 2017, Tam became a member of National People's Congress.

On 9 April, Raymond Tam chi-yuen said he supported the article twenty three of Basic Law should be passed in Hong Kong as soon as possible.

Undersecretary
In 2008 he was offered the opportunity to become an undersecretary for the constitutional and mainland affairs. He is known for renouncing his British citizenship under the 2008 Political Appointments System.

References

Living people
Alumni of the University of Hong Kong
Delegates to the 13th National People's Congress from Hong Kong
Government officials of Hong Kong
1964 births